Écuires is a commune in the Pas-de-Calais department in the Hauts-de-France region of France.

Geography
A village situated just outside Montreuil-sur-Mer on the N1 road.

Places of interest
 The fifteenth-century church of St. Vaast
  The sixteenth-century Château du Quiévremont

Population

See also
Communes of the Pas-de-Calais department

References

Communes of Pas-de-Calais